Cedrick Lattimore (born February 6, 1998) is an American football defensive tackle for the Philadelphia Stars of the United States Football League (USFL). He played college football for the Iowa Hawkeyes, and signed with the Seattle Seahawks as an undrafted free agent in 2020.

Professional career

Seattle Seahawks
Lattimore signed with the Seattle Seahawks as an undrafted free agent following the 2020 NFL Draft on May 4, 2020. He was waived during final roster cuts on September 5, 2020, and signed to the team's practice squad the next day. He was elevated to the active roster on January 9, 2021, for the team's wild card playoff game against the Los Angeles Rams, and reverted to the practice squad after the game. He signed a reserve/futures contract with the Seahawks on January 11, 2021. Lattimore was waived on August 23, 2021.

Philadelphia Stars
Lattimore signed with the Philadelphia Stars of the United States Football League on April 22, 2022, and he was transferred to the team's inactive roster. He was moved to the active roster on May 5.

References

External links
Seattle Seahawks bio
Iowa Hawkeyes football bio

1998 births
Living people
Sportspeople from Wayne County, Michigan
Players of American football from Michigan
American football defensive tackles
Iowa Hawkeyes football players
Seattle Seahawks players
Philadelphia Stars (2022) players
People from Redford, Michigan